Allobates juanii is a species of frog in the family Aromobatidae. It is endemic to Colombia where it is only known from its type locality, a botanical garden in the city of Villavicencio, on the lower slopes of the eastern side of the Cordillera Oriental.

Allobates juanii is on the list of endangered species of the IUCN because of habitat fragmentation and loss.

References

juanii
Amphibians of Colombia
Endemic fauna of Colombia
Taxonomy articles created by Polbot
Amphibians described in 1994